Peripheral unit  may refer to:
 Peripheral unit (country subdivision)
 Peripheral, computer hardware